Robert 'Bob' Thomas Lord  (born 5 June 1945) is a male British former swimmer. He competed in four events at the 1964 Summer Olympics. He won the 1965 British championship over 100 metres freestyle.

References

1945 births
Living people
British male swimmers
Olympic swimmers of Great Britain
Swimmers at the 1964 Summer Olympics
Sportspeople from Coventry
Commonwealth Games medallists in swimming
Commonwealth Games bronze medallists for England
Swimmers at the 1966 British Empire and Commonwealth Games
British male freestyle swimmers
Medallists at the 1966 British Empire and Commonwealth Games